Zoltán Nagy may refer to:

 Zoltán Nagy (ice hockey) (born 1955), Romanian former ice hockey player
 Zoltán Nagy (footballer born 1974), Hungarian football goalkeeper and goalkeeping coach
 Zoltán Nagy (footballer born 1985), Hungarian footballer for Debreceni VSC